Hoplolenus is a genus of beetles in the family Carabidae, containing the following species:

 Hoplolenus congoensis Basilewsky, 1949
 Hoplolenus cyllodinus Fauvel, 1882
 Hoplolenus insignis LaFerte-Senectere, 1851
 Hoplolenus obesus (Murray, 1858)

References

Licininae